Carnivoraformes ("carnivoran-like forms") is a clade of placental mammals that includes the modern order Carnivora and its extinct stem-relatives.

Classification and phylogeny

Classification
In 2010 Flynn, Finarelli & Spaulding named a new clade Carnivoraformes within Carnivoramorpha, containing carnivorans and "miacids" but not viverravids. The authors defined Carnivoraformes as the clade containing Carnivora and all taxa that are more closely related to Carnivora (represented by Canis lupus) than to viverravids (represented by Viverravus gracilis).
 Clade: Carnivoraformes 
 Genus: †Africtis 
 Genus: †Dawsonicyon 
 Genus: †Miacis 
 (unranked): Clade "B"
 Family: †Quercygalidae 
 (unranked): †Gracilocyon/Oodectes clade
 Genus: †Eogale 
 Genus: †Gracilocyon (paraphyletic genus) 
 Genus: †Oodectes (paraphyletic genus) 
 Genus: †Paramiacis 
 Genus: †Paroodectes 
 Incertae sedis:
 †"Miacis" sp. [CM 67873 & CM 77299] 
 Genus: †Messelogale 
 Genus: †Miocyon 
 Genus: †Simamphicyon 
 Genus: †Uintacyon (paraphyletic genus) 
 Genus: †Xinyuictis 
 Genus: †Zodiocyon 
 (unranked): Clade "C"
 Genus: †Dormaalocyon 
 (unranked): †Vulpavus clade
 Genus: †Palaearctonyx 
 Genus: †Vassacyon 
 Genus: †Vulpavus (paraphyletic genus) 
 Incertae sedis:
 †"Miacis" deutschi 
 †"Miacis" exiguus 
 (unranked): Clade "D"
 Order: Carnivora  (carnivorans)
 Suborder: Caniformia  ("dog-like" carnivorans)
 Suborder: Feliformia  ("cat-like" carnivorans)
 Genus: †Ceruttia 
 Genus: †Harpalodon 
 Genus: †Lycarion 
 Genus: †Neovulpavus 
 Genus: †Procynodictis 
 Genus: †Prodaphaenus 
 Genus: †Tapocyon 
 Genus: †Walshius 
 Incertae sedis:
 †"Miacis" gracilis 
 †"Miacis" hargeri 
 †"Miacis" invictus 
 †"Miacis" lushiensis 
 Incertae sedis:
 †"Miacis" boqinghensis 
 †"Miacis" hookwayi 
 †"Miacis" latidens 
 †"Miacis" petilus 
 †Carnivoraformes undet. Genus A 
 †Carnivoraformes undet. Genus B 
 ichnotaxa of Carnivoraformes:
 Ichnogenus: †Falcatipes

Phylogenetic tree
The phylogenetic relationships of Carnivoraformes are shown in the following cladogram:

See also
 Mammal classification
 Carnivoramorpha
 Miacoidea
 Miacidae

References

 
Mammal unranked clades